Plain Township may refer to:

Plain Township, Kosciusko County, Indiana
Plain Township, Renville County, North Dakota, in Renville County, North Dakota
Plain Township, Franklin County, Ohio
Plain Township, Stark County, Ohio
Plain Township, Wayne County, Ohio
Plain Township, Wood County, Ohio

Township name disambiguation pages